Razia Sultana is an Indian politician and a cabinet minister in the Government of Punjab. She represents Malerkotla in the Punjab Legislative Assembly of which she is the only Muslim member. She has been elected three times in the Punjab Assembly, in 2002, 2007 and 2017.

Personal life 
Sultana was born in a middle class Gujjar Muslim family at Malerkotla. She is married to IPS officer Muhammad Mustafa who was former DGP of Punjab. The couple have two children.

Political career 
In early 2000, Sultana joined active politics in Punjab. She contested and won the elections for Punjab assembly from Malerkotla in 2002 on an Indian National Congress ticket. Sultana was voted back to the state legislature for a second time in 2007. In 2012 Punjab Legislative Assembly election, she lost to F. Nesara Khatoon (Farzana Alam). Sultana regained the seat in 2017 Punjab Legislative Assembly election when she beat her own brother Muhammad Arshad from the Aam Aadmi Party. Sultana is a cabinet minister from the Indian National Congress.

She resigned from her post of cabinet minister in the Punjab Government in Solidarity with Navjot Singh Sidhu on 28 September 2021.

References

External links 
 "Hearing in Punjab Wakf Board case adjourned to Sept 28" - One India
Islamic Voice
The Tribune, Chandigarh
The Tribune, Chandigarh

Living people
Members of the Punjab Legislative Assembly
Punjab, India MLAs 2012–2017
Punjab, India MLAs 2017–2022
Indian National Congress politicians from Punjab, India
1966 births
21st-century Indian women politicians
Women members of the Punjab Legislative Assembly